Vyoshki (IPA: [ˈvʲɵʂkʲɪ], [ˈvʲeʂkʲɪ] ) is a rural locality (a selo) in Posyolok Anopino, Gus-Khrustalny District, Vladimir Oblast, Russia. The population was 120 as of 2010. There are 2 streets.

Geography 
Vyoshki is located 17 km northeast of Gus-Khrustalny (the district's administrative centre) by road. Fedotovo is the nearest rural locality.

References 

Rural localities in Gus-Khrustalny District
Melenkovsky Uyezd